The Tapinellaceae are a family of fungi in the order Boletales. Members of this family are: Bondarcevomyces, Pseudomerulius, and Tapinella.

References

Boletales
Basidiomycota families